Wale is an English surname. Notable people with the surname include:

Charles Wale (1765–1845), English general
Gregory Wale (1668–1739), English gentleman
Henry John Wale (1827–1892), English author, soldier, and church minister
Matthew Wale (born 1968), Solomon Islander politician 
Samuel Wale (1721–1786), English painter and book illustrator
Thomas Wale (1701–1796), English gentleman
Thomas Wale (1303–1352), English soldier

English-language surnames